Bhanjpur railway station is a railway station on the South Eastern Railway network in the state of Odisha, India. It serves Baripada town. Its code is VZR. It has two platforms. Passenger, Express and Superfast trains halt at Bhanjpur railway station.

Major trains

 Simlipal Intercity Express

See also
 Mayurbhanj district

References

Railway stations in Mayurbhanj district
Kharagpur railway division